Roza Dam (National ID # WA00275) is a diversion dam on the Yakima River, about  north of Yakima, just west of SR 821. The dam also has 12,000 kW power production capacity, online as of 1956. There is also an adult fish ladder at this location.

See also

List of dams in the Columbia River watershed

External links 

 http://php.ptagis.org/wiki/index.php/Site_Page_RZF_-_Roza_Dam_Fish_Ladder

Dams in Washington (state)
Hydroelectric power plants in Washington (state)
Dams on the Yakima River
Buildings and structures in Kittitas County, Washington
United States Bureau of Reclamation dams
Dams completed in 1939
Energy infrastructure completed in 1939
Dams with fish ladders